Östersund Central Station or Östersund C is the main railway station serving Östersund, Sweden. It is located on the Middle Line (Mittbananand) and the Inland Line (Inlandsbanan) and is served by SJ, Norrtåg and Inlandsbanan-
Trains leave for Stockholm a couple of times per day and once a day by Inlandsbanan to Gällivare (a one-day travel) or to Mora. Norrtå run regiona train services from the station many times per day, west to Åre, Duved or Storlien, or east to Ånge and Sundsvall.

The station building was built in 1879, mainly following the drawings of architect  Adolf W. Edelsvärd (1824–1919). 
The building was constructed entirely in wood. 
English botanist William Dallimore (1871–1959)  visited the station in 1929 and noted that the "best birch panelling" was used.

References

Railway stations in Jämtland County
Östersund